18th Street Northwest is a prominent north–south street thoroughfare in the Northwest quadrant of Washington, D.C.

History
The "18th Street" roadway was part of the 1791 L'Enfant Plan for Washington by Pierre Charles L'Enfant.

In the present day 18th Street also travels through downtown Washington and the Dupont Circle and Mount Pleasant neighborhoods. It is also one of the main streets in the Adams Morgan neighborhood; the other is Columbia Road.

It passes through the Strivers' Section Historic District in the Dupont Circle neighborhood. Many bars, nightclubs, and restaurants are located on 18th Street in Adams Morgan, and on weekends it is frequently congested with cars and pedestrians, especially at last call.

Notable residents

 Margaret Cameron, daughter of Sir Roderick Cameron, commissioned Jules Henri de Sibour in 1912 to build her residence at 1706 18th Street. Today, the residence is home to the Russian News & Information Agency offices (also known as RIA Novosti Bureau or Information Office for the Embassy of the Russian Federation; former offices of the propaganda Soviet Life magazine).
 John Wingate Weeks, the former United States Secretary of War, U.S. Senator and U.S. Representative, who also lived at 1706 18th Street.
 Albert Lasker, advertising executive, and Mary Woodward Lasker, the health activist and philanthropist, also lived at 1706 18th Street.
 David Aiken Reed, a United States Senator from Pennsylvania who also lived at 1706 18th Street. 
 William J. French, a physician who lived at 1742 18th Street, N.W.
 Kristen Grimm Wolf, former executive vice president of Fenton Communications and founder of Spitfire Strategies who lived at 1742 18th Street, N.W.
 Brigadier General Joseph Green Tilford, who lived at 1743 18th Street, N.W., a home designed by architect Thomas Franklin Schneider
 General Isaac Khan Mofakhamed Douley, followed by his cousin Mirza Ali Kuli Khan, who also lived at 1743 18th Street, N.W.
 Brigadier General Louis Collardet, a French military attaché who also lived at 1743 18th Street, N.W.
 Henry Glassie, a folklorist who also lived at 1743 18th Street, N.W.
 Francis C. Dart, an attorney who also lived at 1743 18th Street, N.W.
 The Black Panther Party had its national headquarter in 2327 18th Street, N. W. in 1971.

See also
 Transportation in Washington, D.C.

References

External links

Streets in Washington, D.C.
Adams Morgan
Dupont Circle